Gombong is a town in Kebumen Regency, in the southern part of Central Java, a province in Indonesia. The town has 50,300 inhabitants at the 2020 Census. Local people speak Banyumasan, a dialect of Javanese.

In 1964, construction of the Catholic Church of St. Michael Parish was completed. In 1996,the Wonokriyo market was built, becoming the biggest one in the region. A few dinosaur statues are located around the town: at the entrance of Fort Van der Wijck, at Tirta Manggala Swimming Pools and at Sempor Reservoir. Not far from the town, the prayer house Geraja Ayam, also known as the chicken church, is built.

Fort Van der Wijck, which was built in the early 19th century by General Johannes Van den Bosch, is located in the northern part of the town. The military compound served to train soldiers for later service in the Royal Netherlands East Indies Army. Suharto, the second President of Indonesia, began his service here on 1 June 1940 prior to the Japanese occupation). The fort was used by the Indonesian Armed Forces until 2000. Since then the compound has been developed as a recreational site.

Administrative villages
Gombong consists of 14 villages (kelurahan or desa):
 Banjarsari
 Gombong
 Kalitengah
 Kedungpuji
 Kemukus
 Klopogodo
 Panjangsari
 Patemon
 Semanding
 Semondo
 Sidayu
 Wero
 Wonokriyo
 Wonosigro

Notable people
 Maus Gatsonides (1911), Dutch rally driver and inventor of the speed camera.
 Jan Hamer (1927), Dutch survivor during hurricane Katrina featured in the 2007 book Holding Out and Hanging On: Surviving Hurricane Katrina by Thomas Neff.
 Willem Nijholt (1934), Dutch screen actor and stage artist

References

External links 

Former Dutch fort Van Der Wijck

Kebumen Regency
Districts of Central Java
Populated places in Central Java